Vanessa Carol Ward (née Browne; born 5 January 1963) is a retired high jumper from Australia, who set her personal best on 12 February 1989, jumping 1.98 metres at a meet in Perth, Western Australia. This (as of 2013) still stands as the Australian record. A five-time national champion in the women's high jump event, she competed for her native country at two  Olympic Games, in Los Angeles 1984 and Seoul 1988. She was an Australian Institute of Sport scholarship holder in 1981 to 1984 and 1987 to 1988.

Achievements
Australian high jump record holder - 1.98 metres in 1989 (equalled by Alison Inverarity in 1994)
 Five-time Australian National High Jump Champion (1979, 1984, 1988, 1989, 1990)

Note: result with a Q, indicates overall position in qualifying round.

References

External links
 Vanessa Ward at Australian Athletics Historical Results
 Women's World All-Time List
 
 

Australian female high jumpers
Athletes (track and field) at the 1984 Summer Olympics
Athletes (track and field) at the 1988 Summer Olympics
Athletes (track and field) at the 1982 Commonwealth Games
Athletes (track and field) at the 1986 Commonwealth Games
Athletes (track and field) at the 1990 Commonwealth Games
Olympic athletes of Australia
1963 births
Living people
People educated at Rossmoyne Senior High School
Place of birth missing (living people)
Australian Institute of Sport track and field athletes
Commonwealth Games competitors for Australia
20th-century Australian women
21st-century Australian women